Matthew Kai Stonie (born ) is an American competitive eater and YouTuber. He is the number five ranked competitive eater in Major League Eating. Stonie won the 2015 Nathan's Hot Dog Eating Contest, dethroning 8-time defending champion Joey Chestnut. Stonie has gained fame from his YouTube channel, to which he uploads video footage of his eating challenges.

Early life
Stonie was born in San Francisco, California and raised in San Jose. He is of Japanese, Lithuanian and Czech ancestry. He graduated from Evergreen Valley High School in San Jose. His nickname, "Megatoad," is from the character Toad from the Super Mario franchise. Stonie has a younger brother named Morgan Stonie, who is oftentimes involved with the production of his challenges uploaded to his YouTube channel.

Career
Stonie's Major League Eating debut was at the Stockton Deep Fried Asparagus Championship in Stockton, California in 2011. At the time, he was the youngest member of the Major League Eating organization, being 18 years old. His first win came in 2010 in a lobster roll eating contest in Hampton Beach, New Hampshire.

On July 4, 2015, Stonie defeated eight-time defending Nathan's Hot Dog Eating Contest champion Joey Chestnut by eating 62 hot dogs to Chestnut's 60. Since 2016, Stonie's ranking in Major League Eating has fluctuated between second and fifth.

As of April 2022, Stonie has amassed over 15.3 million subscribers and 3.11 billion video views on his YouTube channel, with his most viewed video having been viewed over 126 million times.

In August of 2022, Stonie partnered with TGI Friday's to release his own franchise of fast casual restaurants, Stonie Bowls. The franchise focuses on large portion rice and poke bowls. Stonie would release the debut announcement of the franchise as a challenge video that urges viewers to beat his time in eating one of the 5 pound ultimate Stonie bowls.

World records held

2013
Birthday cake: 5.5 pounds in 9 minutes and 17 milliseconds (May 26, 2013).
Frozen yogurt: 10.5 pounds of Yogurtland frozen yogurt at Phantom Gourmet Food Festival in 6 minutes (September 29, 2013).
Kookamonga Burger: 7.5 pound burger from the Kooky Canuck in Memphis, Tennessee in 4 minutes, 43 seconds (October 26, 2013).

2014
Indian taco: 32.5 Indian tacos in 8 minutes in Atmore, Alabama (March 29, 2014).
Slugburgers: 43 slugburgers in 10 minutes (The World Slugburger Eating Championship Presented by Main Street Corinth, July 12, 2014).
Pumpkin pie: 20.8 pounds in 8 minutes (Elk Grove Pumpkin Festival, October 5, 2014).
Fastest McDonald's Happy Meal eaten in 15.22 seconds.

2015
Bacon: 182 slices of bacon in 5 minutes in Daytona Beach, Florida (February 22, 2015).
Iguana's Burritozilla: 5 pounds in 1 minute, 50 seconds (May 8, 2015).
Pork sandwiches (8 ounces): 15 sandwiches in 10 minutes at The Backyard at Meadowlands Racing & Entertainment in East Rutherford, New Jersey.
Traditional carne asada tacos: 103 tacos in 8 minutes San Jose, California (August 15, 2015).
Martorano's signature pasta & sauce: 10 pounds in 8 minutes at Martorano's and Paris Hotel & Casino (Las Vegas, October 17, 2015).
Smithfield pork ribs: 71 ribs in 5 minutes (Miami, November 24, 2015).

2016
Silver dollar pancakes: 113 (1 oz) pancakes in 8 minutes (Chico, California, May 28, 2016) at The World Silver Dollar Pancake Eating Championship.
Moon Pies: 85 Moon Pies in 8 minutes (Memphis- October 15, 2016) at The World Moon Pie Eating Championship.

2017
Chicken spiedies: 20.5 chicken spiedies in 10 minutes (Nichols, New York, August 12, 2017) at the Tioga Downs World Chicken Spiedie Eating Championship.

2020
Halloween candy: 4 lbs 1.9 oz of Halloween candy in 6 minutes. (Las Vegas, Nevada, October 31, 2020)

2021
Popcorn: 28.5 24oz servings of popcorn in 8 minutes (Las Vegas, Nevada, April 25, 2021)
Heart Attack Grill: 20,000 calorie burger in 4:10 (Las Vegas, Nevada, July 26, 2021)

Nathan's Famous Hot Dog Eating Contest results

See also
 Competitive eating
 List of competitive eaters

References

External links

Matt Stonie's official website
Matt Stonie profile at Major League Eating

Living people
American competitive eaters
American people of Japanese descent
American YouTubers
Sportspeople from San Jose, California
Twitch (service) streamers
Year of birth missing (living people)